Marcus Lilian Thuram-Ulien (born 6 August 1997) is a French professional footballer who plays as a forward or left winger for Bundesliga club Borussia Mönchengladbach and the France national team. He is the son of former French international player Lilian Thuram.

He began his professional career at Sochaux, where he played in three Ligue 2 seasons, before spending two years in Ligue 1 with Guingamp. In 2019, he joined Borussia Mönchengladbach for a €12 million fee.

Thuram made his senior international debut for France in 2020, and was part of their squads at UEFA Euro 2020 and the 2022 FIFA World Cup, finishing as runner-up at the latter.

Club career

Sochaux
Thuram started his professional career at Sochaux, where he also played for the club Youth Academy. He made his Ligue 2 debut with the club on 20 March 2015 against Châteauroux replacing Edouard Butin after 83 minutes. He played 43 total matches for Sochaux and scored one goal, in a 3–1 loss at Tours on 14 April 2017.

Guingamp
On 5 July 2017, Thuram joined Ligue 1 club Guingamp for an undisclosed fee. In August 2018, he gained attention for playing against Paris Saint-Germain goalkeeper Gianluigi Buffon, a long-term teammate of his father at Parma and Juventus.

Thuram scored an added-time penalty on 9 January 2019 to eliminate holders PSG from the quarter-finals of the Coupe de la Ligue, having earlier missed from the spot in the 2–1 win at the Parc des Princes. Twenty days later he scored the equaliser in a 2–2 home draw with Monaco in the semi-final, and his attempt in the subsequent penalty shootout was saved by Danijel Subašić though Guingamp nonetheless advanced.

Borussia Mönchengladbach

2019–20 season
On 22 July 2019, Borussia Mönchengladbach announced they had signed Thuram on a four-year deal. The transfer fee paid to Guingamp was reported as €12 million. He was given the number 10 shirt, vacated by Thorgan Hazard after his move to Borussia Dortmund.

Thuram made his debut for Gladbach on 9 August in the first round of the DFB-Pokal away to 2. Bundesliga club SV Sandhausen, and scored the only goal. He got his first Bundesliga goals on his fifth appearance on 22 September, scoring both of a 2–1 home win over Fortuna Düsseldorf.

On 31 May 2020, Thuram scored twice in a 4–1 win over 1. FC Union Berlin. He took a knee after his first goal of the match and dedicated the strike in honour of ongoing protests in the United States following the murder of George Floyd.

2021–
On 27 October 2020, Thuram scored twice in a 2–2 draw with Real Madrid in the group stage of the UEFA Champions League. On 19 December, Thuram was sent off for spitting in the face of opponent Stefan Posch as Gladbach fell to a 2–1 defeat to Hoffenheim, and was given a six-match ban and a €40,000 fine.

Thuram failed to score in his first 15 Bundesliga matches of the 2021–22 Bundesliga season. He later scored only three goals, one each against Wolfsburg, Stuttgart and Greuther Fürth.

As of November 2022, Thuram managed to score 10 goals in 15 Bundesliga matches, in which he equaled his personal best since the debut season.

International career
Thuram was a member of France U19 which won the 2016 UEFA European Championship. In November 2020, he was called up for the first time to the senior team, ahead of games against Finland, Portugal and Sweden. He debuted on 11 November in a friendly against the Finns, a 2–0 loss at the Stade de France. He was called up for the delayed UEFA Euro 2020 in May 2021. 

On 14 November 2022, Thuram received a late call-up for the 2022 FIFA World Cup, raising the squad to 26 players. In the final against Argentina, he and Randal Kolo Muani were brought on in place of Ousmane Dembélé and Olivier Giroud with France losing 2–0 in the 41st minute. He assisted Kylian Mbappé's equaliser to make it 2–2 at the end of regulation time, and was also booked for diving in the penalty area; France lost in a penalty shootout after a 3–3 draw.

Personal life
Thuram is the son of the former French international footballer Lilian Thuram, and the older brother of the professional footballer Khéphren Thuram. He was born in the Italian city of Parma while his father played for the club, and was named after Jamaican activist Marcus Garvey. Despite his father playing for Juventus and Barcelona, he as a child supported Milan and Real Madrid.

Career statistics

Club

International

Honours
France U19
UEFA European Under-19 Championship: 2016

France
FIFA World Cup runner-up: 2022

Individual
Bundesliga Rookie of the Month: September 2019, October 2019, November 2019

References

External links
Profile at the Borussia Mönchengladbach website

1997 births
Living people
Sportspeople from Parma
Footballers from Emilia-Romagna
French footballers
Association football forwards
AC Boulogne-Billancourt players
FC Sochaux-Montbéliard players
En Avant Guingamp players
Borussia Mönchengladbach players
Championnat National 2 players
Ligue 2 players
Ligue 1 players
Championnat National 3 players
Bundesliga players
France youth international footballers
France under-21 international footballers
France international footballers
UEFA Euro 2020 players
2022 FIFA World Cup players
Black French sportspeople
French expatriate footballers
Expatriate footballers in Germany
French expatriate sportspeople in Germany
French people of Guadeloupean descent
Thuram family